John Dunstan "Torchy" Atkinson  (3 March 1909 – 27 February 1990) was a New Zealand horticultural scientist and scientific administrator.

Atkinson was born in Wellington, New Zealand on 3 March 1909. His father was the solicitor Arnold Atkinson (1874–1917), and his mother was Mary Herrick Atkinson (née Hursthouse). He was known as Duncan by his family, but friends and colleagues almost all referred to him as Torchy for his red hair, and the name stuck even after he had turned grey. New Zealand's tenth Premier, Sir Harry Atkinson, was his grandfather.

Atkinson wrote his master's thesis at Massey University in 1932 with the title Studies on the dieback of lacebarks, Myxosporium hoheria. n.f.sp. He was the director of Fruit Research Station of the Department of Scientific and Industrial Research (DSIR), and later the director of the Plant Diseases Division. His research has contributed significantly to New Zealand's strong position as an exporter of fruit. After his retirement in 1974, he was commissioned to write the history of the DSIR. In the 1975 New Year Honours, Atkinson was appointed an Officer of the Order of the British Empire, for services to scientific research.

Atkinson died at Birkdale, Auckland, on 27 February 1990.

References

1909 births
1990 deaths
New Zealand horticulturists
20th-century New Zealand botanists
Atkinson–Hursthouse–Richmond family
New Zealand Officers of the Order of the British Empire
People associated with Department of Scientific and Industrial Research (New Zealand)